Large tumor suppressor kinase 2 (LATS2) is an enzyme that in humans is encoded by the LATS2 gene.

This gene encodes a serine/threonine protein kinase belonging to the LATS tumor suppressor family and participates in the Hippo signaling pathway where it inactivates the effector proteins, YAP and WWTR1 (TAZ). The protein localizes to centrosomes during interphase and early and late metaphase. It interacts with the centrosomal proteins aurora-A and ajuba and is required for accumulation of gamma-tubulin and spindle formation at the onset of mitosis. It also interacts with a negative regulator of p53 and may function in a positive feedback loop with p53 that responds to cytoskeleton damage. Additionally, it can function as a corepressor of androgen-responsive gene expression.

References

Further reading

EC 2.7.11